Jason Daniel Kelce (born November 5, 1987) is an American football center for the Philadelphia Eagles of the National Football League (NFL). He was drafted by the Eagles in the sixth round of the 2011 NFL Draft. He played college football at Cincinnati. Kelce is a Super Bowl champion, six-time Pro Bowl selection, and five-time first-team All-Pro selection.

Early life
Kelce was born and grew up in Cleveland Heights, Ohio, the son of Ed Kelce, a sales rep in the steel business, and Donna, who works in banking. He is the older brother of Travis Kelce, a tight end for the Kansas City Chiefs. He attended Cleveland Heights High School, where he played both running back and linebacker and was twice named All-Lake Erie-Lake League. At Cleveland Heights, he played baritone saxophone in the symphonic and jazz bands.

College career
A former walk-on running back, Kelce switched to fullback and then finally to offensive line after redshirting his initial year at Cincinnati, seeing action at center and guard in nine games in 2007 as the Bearcats went 10–3 and defeated Southern Mississippi 31–21 in the PapaJohns.com Bowl.

As a sophomore in 2008, he made 13 starts at left guard, as part of an offensive line that also included future NFL linemen Jeff Linkenbach and Trevor Canfield, which helped the UC offense average 27.3 points and 375.3 yards of total offense per game. The Bearcats went 11–3 overall, were Big East champions, and played in the FedEx Orange Bowl, where the Bearcats fell to Virginia Tech 20–7. His brother, Travis Kelce, began playing alongside him at Cincinnati after he also joined them in 2008.

In 2009, Kelce earned second-team All-Big East honors after starting 13 games at left guard as the Bearcats went undefeated in the regular season (12-0) and were again Big East Champions, once again earning a BCS Bowl berth, losing to Florida 51-24 in the Allstate Sugar Bowl.

He was moved to center for his senior season in 2010 as the Bearcats went 4–8 under new coach Butch Jones. He started the final 38 games of his 47-game Bearcats career, 26 at left guard and 12 at center. He was named Honorable Mention All-America and second-team All-Big East.

Professional career

Philadelphia Eagles
Despite lacking true NFL size, Kelce was projected a fourth to fifth round pick. He ran the fastest 40-yard dash time of all offensive linemen at the 2011 NFL Scouting Combine, with a 4.89-second time. On March 11, 2011, Kelce had an appendectomy after he was diagnosed with appendicitis.

Kelce was selected by the Philadelphia Eagles in the sixth round (191st overall) of the 2011 NFL Draft. Kelce was unable to practice or sign a contract until the NFL lockout was lifted on July 25, 2011. He signed a four-year contract on July 27. New offensive line coach Howard Mudd envisioned Kelce as in the mold of Indianapolis Colts five-time Pro Bowl center Jeff Saturday, whom Mudd coached in Indianapolis for 11 seasons. First-round pick and fellow rookie Danny Watkins compared Kelce to a hedgehog due to his spiky hair and facial hair, in addition to his quickness and stoutness. Kelce battled incumbent starter Jamaal Jackson for the center job early in training camp in August. Kelce received all of the first-team reps in the week before the team's third preseason game. He started in the third preseason game against the Cleveland Browns, and allowed a sack and was penalized for holding. Despite his performance, Kelce was named the starter for the season on August 29. He became the first rookie in Eagles history to start all 16 games at center.

In 2012, Kelce was named the starting center for the second consecutive year. On September 16, he suffered a partially torn MCL and torn ACL in a win over the Baltimore Ravens. Kelce would miss the rest of the 2012 season.

Kelce had an outstanding 2013 season, starting all 16 games and helping the team reach the playoffs. He helped the Eagles score a team-record 442 points and 6,676 yards. He led the way for the NFL's leading rusher, LeSean McCoy, who rushed for 1,607 yards. Kelce was graded by Pro Football Focus (PFF) as the best center in the NFL for the season. He was also honored with the Ed Block Courage Award.

On February 27, 2014, Kelce agreed to a six-year, $37.5 million contract extension, with $13 million guaranteed, according to agent Jason Bernstein. On September 23, Kelce underwent surgery for a sports hernia and missed four games. Despite missing time, he was selected to his first Pro Bowl.

In 2015, Kelce started in all 16 games. He was graded by Pro Football Focus as the 7th-ranked center in the NFL.

In 2016, Kelce started in all 16 games and was selected to his second Pro Bowl.

In 2017, Kelce started in all 16 games and had his best season as a pro. He was selected as a First-team All-Pro and was the highest rated offensive lineman by PFF. He also won Run Blocker of the Year by PFF. He won Super Bowl LII with the Eagles, defeating the New England Patriots 41–33.

During the Eagles' Super Bowl parade on February 8, 2018, Kelce garnered national attention after giving an impassioned speech where he defended his teammates, coaches, and front office and compared Eagles fans to hungry dogs who "for 52 years have been starved of this championship," while famously dressed up as a mummer.

In 2018, Kelce was given his second First-team All-Pro honor.

On March 2, 2019, Kelce signed a one-year contract extension with the Eagles through the 2021 season. During the 2019 season, Kelce was elected to his 3rd Pro Bowl and received his 3rd straight First-team All-Pro Honor.

In 2020, Kelce started his 100th straight game with the Eagles. The offensive line saw a franchise record 14 different starting combinations, but Kelce was the lone man to start every game. He was elected to his 4th Pro Bowl, and was one of the eight finalists for the Art Rooney Award in 2020.

On March 5, 2021, Kelce signed a new deal with the Philadelphia Eagles. He was placed on the COVID list on January 3, 2022, and activated four days later, allowing him to keep his consecutive starts streak alive. He went in for the team's first offensive snap then was benched for the rest of the game. In 2021, Kelce was selected to his fifth Pro Bowl, marking his third straight selection, and was the Eagles finalist for the Walter Payton Man of the Year Award. He was also named a first-team All Pro by the Associated Press for the fourth time in his career.

On March 11, 2022, after mulling retirement before the 2022 offseason, Kelce signed a new one-year deal with the Eagles worth $14 million, which made him the highest paid center in the NFL.

Kelce and the Eagles appeared in Super Bowl LVII against the Kansas City Chiefs. Jason's brother Travis Kelce played for the Chiefs, making it the first Super Bowl to feature two brothers on opposing teams. Jason and the Eagles lost to Travis and the Chiefs 38-35.

After considering retirement, Kelce re-signed with the Eagles on a one-year contract on March 15, 2023.

Awards and honors

NFL
 Super Bowl champion (LII)
 5× First-team All-Pro (2017–2019, 2021, 2022)
 6× Pro Bowl (2014, 2016, 2019–2022)

College
 2× Second-team All-Big East (2009, 2010)

Personal life
Kelce is the elder son of Ed and Donna Kelce and brother of Kansas City Chiefs tight end Travis Kelce. Ed Kelce was a sales representative in the steel business. Donna Kelce is known for attending both of her sons' games, and is often seen wearing a two-sided jersey featuring both of their names. She traveled from Tampa to Kansas City to attend both of her sons' Wild Card round games on January 16, 2022. In high school, aside from football, Jason played hockey and Travis played basketball.

Kelce met his future wife Kylie McDevitt on an online dating app before marrying on April 14, 2018. Their first two daughters were born in October 2019 and March 2021, respectively. Kylie was 38 weeks pregnant with their third child on the Super Bowl Sunday for Super Bowl LVII. They had their third daughter in February 2023.

Television appearances
Along with then-teammate Beau Allen, Kelce appeared in the Super Bowl LII-themed episode of It's Always Sunny in Philadelphia, "Charlie's Home Alone", in Charlie Kelly's imagination.

On March 4, 2023, Jason was on Saturday Night Live when Travis was that episode’s host, and appeared as both an audience member with his parents, and in a sketch with his brother and SNL cast members Heidi Gardner and Chloe Fineman.

New Heights with Jason and Travis Kelce
In September 2022, the Kelce brothers launched a weekly podcast, New Heights with Jason and Travis Kelce. Episodes are released every Wednesday during the NFL season, with video highlights available on multiple social media platforms.

In a joint statement prior to the first episode’s release, the brothers shared their reason for starting the project:
We are two brothers from Cleveland Heights who, as kids, had a dream of turning pro, and now we’re here to give our thoughts from inside the game. We’ve been waiting for the right moment to do this show, and with 12 Pro Bowls and 2 rings between us, we have a few things to say about the league, the new talent on the field, the upcoming season, and our lives off the field. There will be a few notable names to join us on episodes, but for the most part, this will be a raw dialogue between two brothers who had the chance to live out their childhood football dreams together.

A Philly Special Christmas
Along with teammates Lane Johnson and Jordan Mailata, Kelce collaborated on the Christmas album A Philly Special Christmas, which was released in December 2022.

Last name pronunciation
During the 2021 offseason, Travis Kelce said their immediate family pronounces the last name   because that is the way their father pronounces it, although the rest of the paternal side of the family pronounces it  . Jason elaborated that their father "at some point ... got tired of correcting everyone calling him 'Kell-see.' ... And now I think we're both at the point where we're riding with Ed 'Kell-see.

References

External links

Philadelphia Eagles bio
University of Cincinnati bio

1987 births
Living people
American football centers
Cincinnati Bearcats football players
Cleveland Heights High School alumni
Ed Block Courage Award recipients
National Conference Pro Bowl players
People from Cleveland Heights, Ohio
Philadelphia Eagles players
Players of American football from Ohio
Sportspeople from Cuyahoga County, Ohio
Sportspeople from Greenville, North Carolina
Unconferenced Pro Bowl players